Dominique Fernandez (born 25 August 1929) is a French writer of novels, essays and travel books. Much of his writing explores homosexual experience and creativity. In 1982 he won the Prix Goncourt for his novel about Pier Paolo Pasolini; and in 2007 he was elected a  member of the Académie française.

Biography
Fernandez was born in France on 25 August 1929, in Neuilly-sur-Seine, Hauts-de-Seine, near Paris. He is the son of Ramón Fernández, a literary critic whose reputation was tarnished when he served during World War II on the executive committee of the Parti Populaire Français, collaborating with France's Nazi occupiers. He died in 1944. Dominique Fernandez's inaugural speech in the Academy in 2007 was a defence of his father. Fernandez was educated at the École Normale Supérieure. He gained a doctorate in Italian literature.

In 1957 and 1958 he taught in Naples at the French Institute. Fernandez's literary career began in 1958 with a study of the modern Italian novel. He then worked as a literary critic for the weekly, L'Express and as a reader for the publishers Grasset. He holds a regular column in the Swiss magazine of art and culture: Artpassions.

In 1961 he married Diane de Margerie, with whom he had a son, and a daughter, Laetitia Fernandez. They divorced in 1971. From 1966 to 1989 he taught Italian literature at the University of Haute-Bretagne at Rennes. He was then a critic for Le Nouvel Observateur and for an opera periodical. When he became a member of the Académie française in 2007, he chose for the hilt of his ceremonial sword an image of Ganymede.

Further reading
 L. Cairns, Privileged Pariahdom: homosexuality in the novels of Dominique Fernandez (1996)

References 

 

1929 births
Living people
People from Neuilly-sur-Seine
French people of Mexican descent
20th-century French novelists
21st-century French novelists
Writers from Île-de-France
French gay writers
French LGBT novelists
École Normale Supérieure alumni
Academic staff of Rennes 2 University
Members of the Académie Française
Prix Goncourt winners
Prix Médicis winners
Lambda Literary Award winners
French male novelists
Grand prix Jean Giono recipients
French literary critics
Officiers of the Légion d'honneur
20th-century French male writers
21st-century French male writers
French male non-fiction writers
French essayists